The "Tale of the Doomed Prince" is an ancient Egyptian story, dating to the 18th Dynasty, written in hieratic text, which survived partially on the verso of Papyrus Harris 500 currently housed in the British Museum. The papyrus was burned in an explosion; because of this damage the conclusion of the story is missing. Some scholars speculate that the missing ending was mostly likely a happy one and that the tale could be more aptly named "The Prince who was Threatened by Three Fates" or the like.

There are dozens of translations of this story from a wide variety of scholars. The translations by Miriam Lichtheim and William Kelly Simpson from the 1970s are both widely accepted versions.

Synopsis
The story goes as follows: The king of Egypt was very sad that a son had not yet been born to him. The king prays to the gods, and that night his wife conceives a child. When the king's son is born the seven Hathors (goddesses, who pronounce the fate of each child at birth) foretell that he will die either by crocodile, snake or dog. His father, afraid for his son’s safety, builds his son an isolated palace in the mountains, so as to keep him away from danger.

One day the prince sees from his palace a man with a dog. He asks his father for a dog. The king warily gives the prince a dog, not wishing his son to be unhappy. When the prince grows up, he decides to face his doom, travelling abroad to Nahrin. There he meets a group of young men competing for the heart of the princess. The prince succeeds in winning the heart of a princess by jumping (possibly flying) to the window of the room where the princess is locked up. The prince did not tell the king the truth about himself, but said he was the son of a charioteer, and explained that he had had to leave home because of his new stepmother. Eventually the king agrees to let the prince-in-disguise marry his daughter, after seeing the merits of the young man.

After marrying the princess he tells her of his three dooms, and of his prince-hood. She urges him to kill the dog, but the prince cannot bear to kill the dog he has raised from a puppy. His wife watches over him dutifully, and stops a snake from biting the prince in his sleep. Thus, one of the prince’s fates is defeated. Some time after that the prince goes for a walk with his dog. The dog begins speaking (the dog possibly bites the prince), and tells the prince he is meant to be killed by the dog. Fleeing from the dog, he runs to a lake where he is seized by a crocodile who, instead of killing him, enlists his help in its fight against a demon (or a water spirit). [This is where the tale breaks off].

Significance
This story is an example of an Egyptian folktale. It shows the existence of written and oral traditions in ancient Egyptian culture.

The story also emphasizes the importance of the concept of fate to the Egyptian society: the idea of personal fate, destiny or doom surely played an integral role in people’s lives.

The tale also highlights the perception of bravery and heroism: the prince performs a feat of daring heroism to rescue and marry the princess. In addition, something can be seen in this story of the relationship between husband and wife: the husband is honest with his wife, and the wife protects her husband.

Another important point is the fact that the prince leaves Egypt and goes abroad to seek his fortune. It details aspects of the prince's life once he leaves his homeland.

Motifs
Some of its motifs reappear in later European fairy tales:
 The birth of a child is long delayed.(cf. "Sleeping Beauty")
 Death is foretold at birth (cf. "Sleeping Beauty", "The Youth who was Doomed to be Hanged", "The Two Kings' Children")
 The attempt to prevent doom by measures of isolation from the natural environment (cf. "Sleeping Beauty")
 Three is the number of the dangers/tasks awaiting the protagonist 
 Death of the mother, replaced by a stepmother who hates the protagonist(s) (cf. "Snowwhite", "Hansel and Gretel", "Cinderella") 
 Leaving home to seek one's destiny/fortune
 Hiding one's true identity (cf. "Snow White", "Little Red Riding Hood"; Donkeyskin, "Iron John")
 Freeing a princess locked up in a high tower (cf. "Rapunzel")
 Competing with rivals and potential suitors to the princess in an engagement challenge, namely, jumping very high to reach the top of a tower (cf. "The Princess on the Glass Hill", "Iron John")
 Talking animals (cf. The Princess and the Frog; ATU tale types ATU 554, "The Grateful Animals")
 A person/animal setting (often unpalatable) conditions for helping the protagonist (cf. The Princess and the Frog, "Rumpelstiltskin")
 Cheating death, the ability to overcome doom

Fate goddesses

The Seven Hathors who appear at the prince's birth to decree his fate may appear analogous to the Moirai or Parcae of Graeco-Roman mythology, or to the Norns of Norse mythology.

Inevitability of fate

Since the tale ends on an ambiguous note, some versions and translations of the story conclude with the death of the prince, as if to keep with the idea of inevitability of fate or the futility of trying to escape it. Under this lens, the tale is close to Aarne–Thompson–Uther Index tale type ATU 930, "The Prophecy that Poor boy shall marry rich girl". One example is Indian tale The King Who Would Be Stronger Than Fate: the king tries to dispose of his predestined future son-in-law, but his actions only serve to ensure that such fate will come to pass.

In folkloristics, the tale is classified as ATU 934A, "The Predestined Death".

Avoidance of fate

Once again, due to the unknown precise ending of the story, and also to the general direction of the traits (the dog’s hesitance, the death of the snake, the crocodile’s offer of help) one very likely conclusion of the tale is the general avoidance of the prince’s gruesome fate and the more positive ending of having him avoid death by those creatures, eventually being free of his doomed fate.

Adaptations

Literature
The Tale of the Doomed Prince has been translated into French, by Gaston Maspero, as Le Prince prédestiné. Andrew Lang listed as his source for the tale The Prince and the Three Fates in The Brown Fairy Book.

References

Bibliography
 William Kelly Simpson, ed., The Literature of Ancient Egypt: An Anthology of Stories, Instructions, and Poetry (New Haven: Yale University Press, 1973), 85–91.
 Gaston Maspero, Popular Stories of Ancient Egypt,  Kessinger Publishing 2003, pp. 185ff.
 M. Lichtheim, Ancient Egyptian Literature, vol.2, (Berkeley: University of California Press, 1976), 200-203.
 Graham Anderson, Fairytale in the Ancient World, Routledge 2000, 
 Wiedemann, Alfred, Volksmund, Band VI. Alfred Wiedemann Altaegyptische Sagen und Maerchen", Deutsche Verlagsaktiengesellschaft Leipzig, 1906, pp. 78 – 85
 Chris Eyre, On Fate, Crocodiles and the Judgement of the Dead: Some Mythological Allusions in Egyptian Literature, Studien zur Altägyptischen Kultur Vol. 4 (1976): 104-114, accessed October 5, 2010, .

Further reading
 Bleeker, C. J. "Die Idee Des Schicksals in Der Altägyptischen Religion." Numen 2, no. 1/2 (1955): 28-46. .
 Eyre, Christopher J. "The Evil Stepmother and the Rights of a Second Wife." The Journal of Egyptian Archaeology 93 (2007): 223-43. .
 Field, Asha Chauhan. "Goddesses Gone Wild: The Seven Hathors in the New Kingdom." In Current Research in Egyptology 2011: Proceedings of the Twelfth Annual Symposium, edited by Gawad Heba Abd El, Andrews Nathalie, Correas-Amador Maria, Tamorri Veronica, and Taylor James, 48-54. Oxford; Oakville: Oxbow Books, 2012. .
 Gosline, Sheldon. (1999). Orthographic Notes on the "Tale of the Doomed Prince". Zeitschrift für Ägyptische Sprache und Altertumskunde. 126. pp. 111-116. .
 Hollis, Susan Tower. "Late Egyptian Literary Tales." In Re-Wiring The Ancient Novel, 2 Volume Set: Volume 1: Greek Novels, Volume 2: Roman Novels and Other Important Texts, edited by Cueva Edmund, Harrison Stephen, Mason Hugh, Owens William, and Schwartz Saundra, 279-96. Luxembourg: Barkhuis, 2018. .
 Morillas, Bellido & María, José. (2009). Dos visiones hispano-medievales de un cuento del Egipto faraónico: variaciones de Abū Ḥāmid Al-Garnāṭī y Juan Ruiz de Alcalá, Arcipreste de Hita, sobre El príncipe predestinado. 71. . 
 Posener, G. "On the Tale of the Doomed Prince." The Journal of Egyptian Archaeology 39 (1953): 107. .
 Spalinger, Anthony. (2007). Transformations in Egyptian Folktales. In: Revue d'Égyptologie, 58. pp. 137-156. .
 Tyldesley, Joyce, and Julian Heath. "THE PRINCE, THE DOG, THE SNAKE AND THE CROCODILE." In Stories from Ancient Egypt, 65-77. Oxford, UK: Oxbow Books, 2005. .
 Vidal, Jordi. (2012). Summaries on the Young Idrimi. Scandinavian Journal of the Old Testament. 26. . 
 Xella, Paolo. "La figure du «Prince prédestiné» au Proche-Orient ancien: destin des puissants et volonté des dieux". In: Pouvoir, divination et prédestination dans le monde antique''. Besançon: Institut des Sciences et Techniques de l'Antiquité, 1999. pp. 159–173. (Collection « ISTA », 717) https://www.persee.fr/doc/ista_0000-0000_1999_act_717_1_1571

External links
 , a translation of the complete German text by Alfred Wiedemann, The Doomed Prince
 , a photograph of the papyrus containing the tale of The Doomed Prince
 , website containing information about The Doomed Prince
 , website through the University of Munchen providing more information

Doomed Prince, Tale of the
Egyptian fairy tales
Papyrus
Male characters in fairy tales
Fictional princes
Destiny
ATU 850-999
ATU 500-559